is a Japanese male weightlifter, competing in the 56 kg category and representing Japan at international competitions. He participated at the 2000 Summer Olympics in the 56 kg event. He competed at world championships, most recently at the 1999 World Weightlifting Championships.

Major results

References

External links 
 

1973 births
Living people
Japanese male weightlifters
Weightlifters at the 2000 Summer Olympics
Olympic weightlifters of Japan
Sportspeople from Fukushima Prefecture
Place of birth missing (living people)